Her Debt of Honor is a 1916 American silent drama film directed by William Nigh and starring Valli Valli, William B. Davidson and John Goldsworthy.

Cast
 Valli Valli as Marian Delmar
 William B. Davidson as John Hartfield
 William Nigh as Olin Varcoe
 John Goldsworthy as Crawford Granger 
 Frank Bacon as Dr. Glade
 Mathilde Brundage as Mrs. Varcoe 
 Ilean Hume as Niatana
 Frank Montgomery as Kalatin
 David Thompson as Pierre Leroux 
 R.A. Bresee as Old Wolf
 Jack Murray as Swiftwind

References

Bibliography
Parish, James Robert & Pitts, Michael R. Film directors: a guide to their American films. Scarecrow Press, 1974.

External links
 

1916 films
1916 drama films
1910s English-language films
American silent feature films
Silent American drama films
Films directed by William Nigh
Metro Pictures films
1910s American films